Gavin Melaugh (born 9 July 1981) is a former Northern Irish  footballer who played as a midfielder.

Club Honours

Glentoran -  Irish League 2004/05; Irish Cup 2003/04, Irish Cup Runner-Up 2005/06.

References

1981 births
Living people
Association footballers from Northern Ireland
Association football midfielders
Rochdale A.F.C. players
English Football League players